Liesveld is a former municipality in the western Netherlands, in the province of South Holland, and the region of Alblasserwaard. The former municipality had a population of 9,810 in 2006, and covered an area of 44.44 km² (17.16 mile²) of which 3.37 km² (1.30 mile²) was water. Since 2013 Liesveld had been a part of the new municipality of Molenwaard (ceased to exist in 2019).

The former municipality of Liesveld was formed on 1 January 1986 from the former municipalities of Groot-Ammers, Langerak, Nieuwpoort, and Streefkerk. It consisted of the population centres Groot-Ammers, Langerak, Nieuwpoort, Streefkerk, and Waal.

Its name is probably derived from a low-lying swampy area filled with reed grasses (Dutch: lies - Glyceria maxima) near Gelkenes. Castle Liesvelt was built on such a reedy field, giving its name to the Lords of Liesvelt, who owned lands within the municipality.

External links

Official Website

1986 establishments in the Netherlands
States and territories established in 1986
Municipalities of the Netherlands disestablished in 2013
Former municipalities of South Holland
Molenlanden